Gene Garfield may refer to:

 Eugene K. Garfield (1936–2010), American lawyer
 Eugene Garfield (1925–2017), American linguist